Niklas Andersen (born 20 November 1997) is a Danish ice hockey player for Fischtown Pinguins in the Deutsche Eishockey Liga (DEL) and the Danish national team.

He represented Denmark at the 2021 IIHF World Championship.

References

External links

1997 births
Living people
Danish expatriate ice hockey people
Danish expatriate sportspeople in Germany
Danish expatriate sportspeople in the United States
Danish ice hockey centres
Danish ice hockey right wingers
Esbjerg Energy players
Expatriate ice hockey players in Germany
Expatriate ice hockey players in the United States
Fischtown Pinguins players
People from Esbjerg
Spokane Chiefs players
Sportspeople from the Region of Southern Denmark